The Portuguese Workers' Communist Party/Re-Organized Movement of the Party of the Proletariat (PCTP/MRPP) is a Maoist political party in Portugal.

History and overview 
The party was founded in 1970 with the name Movimento Reorganizativo do Partido do Proletariado (MRPP), led by Arnaldo de Matos. It changed its name to the Portuguese Workers' Communist Party in 1976.

The PCTP-MRPP has held a Maoist political orientation since its foundation. In 1971, the party began to publish a newspaper called "Luta Popular" (People's Struggle), directed by Saldanha Sanches. The party was among the most active resistance movements before the Carnation Revolution, especially among students in Lisbon. After the revolution, the MRPP achieved fame for its large murals. The party became intensely active during 1974 and 1975. At that time, the party boasted members who later became important political figures, including José Manuel Durão Barroso and Fernando Rosas, who subsequently left the party. The party, however, never managed to elect a single Member of Parliament in legislative elections.

During the revolutionary period of 1974 and 1975, the MRPP was accused by the Portuguese Communist Party of being an agent of the CIA, a belief that was fueled by cooperation between the MRPP and the Socialist Party against the communist program defended by the Portuguese Communist Party.

The party's youth wing, now extinct, was the Marxist–Leninist Students Federation, to which José Manuel Durão Barroso, a future Prime Minister from the centre-right Social Democratic Party, briefly belonged.

The party entered a phase of internal turmoil following the 2015 legislative elections, with its leader António Garcia Pereira leaving the party. Details about the internal functioning of the party became difficult to obtain, since none of the official contacts responded to contacts, and even the official headquarters seemed to no longer be functioning. An extraordinary congress was announced, but it is unknown if it really happened. Some sources claim the party is now operating at a clandestine level.

Despite this, the party contested the 2017 local elections, gaining 12,387 votes (0.24%) but losing the two council seats they held.

On 22 February 2019 Arnaldo Matos, founder and leader of the PCTP/MRPP since 1970, died.

Election results

Assembly of the Republic 

1 PCTP-MRPP had only presented lists to 9 electoral circles

European Parliament

See also 
 Politics of Portugal
 List of political parties in Portugal
 Carnation Revolution
 Marxist–Leninist Students Federation
 Maoism

Notes

References

External links 
Homepage of PCTP/MRPP 

1970 establishments in Portugal
Communist parties in Portugal
Maoist parties
Maoist organizations in Europe
Organisations based in Lisbon
Political parties established in 1970
Political parties in Portugal
Far-left political parties